Zhou Tong may refer to:

 Zhou Tong (archer) (died 1121), the second military arts tutor of Song Dynasty General Yue Fei
 Zhou Tong (Water Margin), a fictional character from the Water Margin novel
 Zhou Tong (footballer) (born 1990), Chinese footballer

See also
Zhou (surname)